A Batini is a vodka-based cocktail that is the official drink of the Austin Bat Fest.
The drink was created by bartenders from the Four Seasons Hotel Austin. The Batini is known as the official drink of Austin.

History 
In August 2004, The Austin Convention and Visitor's Bureau hosted a contest to designate the official drink of Austin. Five Austin-area hotels submitted recipes to become the official Batini for the city. The Four Seasons Austin recipe won the contest and was on the menu at the Lobby Lounge.

In 2006, the Four Seasons won the Batini contest again with their "Batini Black" entrant. The Batini black was similar to the original, including Tito's Vodka, and Blue Curacao but added in a splash of simple syrup, grapefruit juice, champagne and fresh blackberries.

A Batini contest is an annual event for local bartenders at the Austin Bat Fest.

Ingredients and preparation 
The ingredients needed for the Batini are:

 Tito's Vodka 
 Chambord 
 Blue Curacao
 Sangria
 Red wine
 Cherry garnish

All of the ingredients are shaken together and served with a cherry garnish.

Variations

Batini Black 
Ingredients in a Batini Black are: 

 Tito's Vodka
 Blue Curacao
 Splash of simple syrup
 Grapefruit juice
 Fresh blackberries
 Topped with champagne

Shake together Tito's, Blue Curacao, splash of simple syrup, grapefruit juice, and fresh blackberries. Strain into a cocktail glass and top off with champagne.

References

External links 
 Batini Black Food Network Recipe

Cocktails with vodka